The Perseus molecular cloud (Per MCld) is a nearby (~1000 ly) giant molecular cloud in the constellation of Perseus and contains over 10,000 solar masses of gas and dust covering an area of 6 by 2 degrees. Unlike the Orion molecular cloud it is almost invisible apart from two clusters, IC 348 and NGC 1333, where low-mass stars are formed. It is very bright at mid and far-infrared wavelengths and in the submillimeter originating in dust heated by the newly formed low-mass stars.

It shows a curious ring structure in maps made by the IRAS and MSX satellites and the Spitzer Space Telescope and has been detected by the COSMOSOMAS at microwave frequencies as a source of anomalous "spinning dust" emission.

References

More on THE ASTROPHYSICAL JOURNAL http://iopscience.iop.org/0004-637X/656/1/293

Molecular clouds
Perseus (constellation)
Star-forming regions